Ostabat-Asme, Hostavalem in the Middle Ages,  is a commune in the Pyrénées-Atlantiques department, in south-western France. It was the meeting point of 4 European ways to Santiago de Compostela, 3 of them joining together there, namely Paris - Tours - Poitiers - Dax, from Center - Europe linking to Limoges, from Genoa and Lyon through Moissac, the fourth one the Toulouse way, linking Central Italy with the Languedoc region, the Toulouse region and linking though the Béarn region, via Lescar-Oloron to Somport, Spain, and the Spanish Pyrénées.

The 3 linked Saint James ways proceed from there, through Larceveau-Arros-Cibits, Ainhice-Mongelos, Gamarthe, Lacarre and Iriberry towards Saint-Jean-le-Vieux, (43º09'57"N, 1º11'32" W), a.k.a. Donazaharre   to Saint-Jean-Pied-de-Port, and to the Spanish Frontier, Roncesvalles, (42º59'23"N, 1º20'4"W) .

It is located in the former province of Lower Navarre. It gives its name to the region of Ostabarret.

See also
Communes of the Pyrénées-Atlantiques department

References

External links

 IZURA-AZME in the Bernardo Estornés Lasa - Auñamendi Encyclopedia (Euskomedia Fundazioa) 

Communes of Pyrénées-Atlantiques
Lower Navarre
Pyrénées-Atlantiques communes articles needing translation from French Wikipedia